Schoenobiodes is a genus of moths of the family Crambidae.

Species
Schoenobiodes lanceolata (Roepke, 1943)
Schoenobiodes strata (Schultze, 1907)

References

Natural History Museum Lepidoptera genus database

Crambinae
Crambidae genera
Taxa named by George Hampson